Zora was a literature journal published by Serb intelligentsia between 1896 and 1901 in Mostar, Bosnia and Herzegovina under Austro-Hungarian rule. It was published monthly, in Serbian Cyrillic. Its chief editor was Aleksa Šantić. Besides Šantić, members of its editorial team were Svetozar Ćorović, Jovan Dučić and Atanasije Šola (Šola was one of its editors although his name was not presented in the first several issues of Zora).

History
The request to allow publishing of Zora was submitted on 30 November 1895 to the Government in Sarajevo. Austrian intelligence reported that its editor, Aleksa Šantić, was involved with politics, but "within limits". Benjamin Kallay accepted positive opinion of the Government in Sarajevo, after extensive correspondence between Kotar governor – Government in Sarajevo – County of Mostar, and on 28 February 1896 allowed publishing of the journal. He also wrote detailed instructions to the Mostar County how to surveil and censor future journal to prevent it becoming a political journal instead of a literature one. The first edition was published on 30 April 1896.

The literature magazine Zora was published under patronage of Serbian Singing Society "Gusle". Šantić became the editor-in-chief of this magazine review Zora (Dawn; 1896–1901) published by Serbian Cultural Society in Mostar which was among the most important societies which struggled for preservation of Serb cultural autonomy and national rights. Zora became one of the best Serbian literature magazines. The journal Zora gathered members of the Serbian intelligentsia who strived to improve education of Serbian population necessary to reach economic and political progress. Šantić and Ćorović invited people to subscribe to Zora emphasizing that they founded this magazine to 'inform part of Serbs who live here about the spiritual legacy of their greatest sons, with the best representatives of modern Serbian literature'.".

Legacy
To mark the centenary of Šantić's birth, a special edition of Zora was republished in 1968 in Mostar.

Notes

Footnotes

Citations

Sources 

Defunct literary magazines published in Europe
History of the Serbs of Bosnia and Herzegovina
Literary magazines
Magazines disestablished in 1901
Magazines established in 1896
Magazines published in Bosnia and Herzegovina
Mass media in Mostar
Monthly magazines
Serbian-language magazines